Domestic is a 2012 Romanian comedy film directed by Adrian Sitaru.

Cast 
 Adrian Titieni as Domnul Lazar
 Gheorghe Ifrim as Domnul Mihaes
 Ioana Flora as Ileana
 Clara Vodă as Doamna Lazar

References

External links 

2012 comedy films
2012 films
Romanian comedy films